The 2013 season was Pakhtakor's 22nd season in the top Uzbek League in Uzbekistan. Pakhtakor competed in the Uzbek League, Uzbek Cup and AFC Champions League tournaments.

Club

Current technical staff

Squad

Transfers

Winter 2012-13

In:

 
 

  

  

  
  
  
 
 

Out:

Summer 2013

In:

Out:

Friendly matches

Pre-season

Competitions
Pakhtakor is present in all major competitions: Uzbek League, the AFC Champions League and the Uzbek Cup.

Uzbek League

Results

League table

Uzbek Cup

AFC Champions League

Group stage

Squad statistics

Goal scorers

All competitions

Uzbek League

Uzbek Cup

AFC Champions League

Last updated: 8 November 2013

References

Sport in Tashkent
Pakhtakor Tashkent FK seasons
Uzbekistani football clubs 2013 season